Tuanjiehu Subdistrict is a subdistrict on the west portion of Chaoyang District, Beijing, China. As of 2020, it has a total population of 32,091.

The subdistrict was named after Tuanjie Lake, which in turn was named so because it was created by people all over Chaoyang District working in unison.

History

Administrative Division 
In 2021, there are 6 communities under Tuanjiehu Subdistrict:

References 

Chaoyang District, Beijing
Subdistricts of Beijing